Ryan David Semple is an English former footballer who is mostly known for his spells at Peterborough United & Boston United. He finished playing in summer 2014 to take up a full-time role within the Peterborough United Academy.

He returned to playing, signing for Deeping Rangers in February 2016.

Career
Semple began his career with Peterborough United where he played alongside Luke Steele and Sean St Ledger. During this time he spent two weeks training with Manchester United in summer 2002 and participating in an International under 17 tournament in Portugal and making his league debut aged 17 years and three months against Bristol City in October 2002. His progress at Peterborough was affected by a broken leg towards the end of the 2002–03 season and, in a bid to recover fitness, he joined Farnborough Town on loan in November 2003, remaining for two months and scoring twice in nine league appearances. Despite his initial promise, Semple struggled to have a regular place in the Peterborough team and, in four seasons, he made just 15 league starts, with another 26 appearances from the substitutes' bench.

In July 2006, Semple left Peterborough to join Lincoln City on a two-year contract but struggled to make an impact. A hamstring injury coupled with a lack of form limited him to just four substitute appearances in the league in his first season whilst a loan spell with Chester City was also unproductive.

At the beginning of the 2007–08 season, Semple was loaned to Rushden & Diamonds but, after just four appearances, he returned to Lincoln. In January 2008, having failed to even make the substitutes' bench for Lincoln, he was transfer listed by Lincoln's new manager, Peter Jackson, before he agreed to have his Lincoln contract cancelled at the end of January 2008.

In February 2008, he linked up with Oxford United on non-contract terms but the spell lasted only a single appearance and two weeks before he was released. In March 2008, he agreed to join Brackley Town, a club managed by his one-time Peterborough teammate David Oldfield. Semple left Brackley at the end of the 2007–08 season and spent most of the summer of 2008 without a club. In July 2008, he spent a brief period on trial at Boston United but was not offered a deal. Semple joined Deeping Rangers days before the start of the 2008–2009 season, scoring in his first match as Deeping defeated Rothwell Corinthians 5–0 on 9 August 2008. He had a rich scoring season with the club, the highlight being five goals against Sleaford Town on 23 September 2008. In April 2009, he signed dual forms with Haverhill Rovers to help them in their quest to avoid relegation from the Ridgeons League Premier Division; Semple works with their manager Peter Betts. On 5 June 2009, Semple joined Gainsborough Trinity. On 4 March 2010, he moved to Boston United.

On 29 April 2012, just after two years at the club he was released by the manager Jason Lee along with several other players and joined Corby Town. In June 2013 he joined Bury Town. In January 2014, he rejoined Boston United.

References

External links

Lincoln City F.C. official profile
Rushden & Diamonds F.C. official profile
Ryan Semple Pprofile at The Forgotten Imp

1985 births
Living people
English footballers
Sportspeople from Peterborough
Peterborough United F.C. players
Farnborough F.C. players
Lincoln City F.C. players
Chester City F.C. players
Rushden & Diamonds F.C. players
Oxford United F.C. players
Brackley Town F.C. players
Gainsborough Trinity F.C. players
Boston United F.C. players
Corby Town F.C. players
Bury Town F.C. players
English Football League players
National League (English football) players
Deeping Rangers F.C. players
Association football midfielders
Manchester City F.C. non-playing staff
Peterborough United F.C. non-playing staff